The 24 & 25 Vict c 95, sometimes referred to as the Criminal Statutes Repeal Act 1861, was an Act of the Parliament of the United Kingdom.

This Act was repealed by section 1(1) of, and Schedule 1 to, the Statute Law Revision Act 1950. It was spent.

This Act was repealed for the Republic of Ireland by sections 2(1) and 3(1) of, and Part 4 of Schedule 2 to, the Statute Law Revision Act 2007.

This Act was one of the Criminal Law Consolidation Acts 1861. It effected repeals consequential on the other six Acts.

It "should have been the last Act of the series to receive the Royal Assent, and have been numbered accordingly."

References
Halsbury's Statutes,
George Kettilby Rickards. The Statutes of the United Kingdom of Great Britain and Ireland, 24 & 25 Victoria, 1861. Printed by Eyre and Spottiswoode, printers to the Queen. London. 1861. Pages 321 to 334.
A Collection of the Public General Statutes passed in the Twenty-fourth and Twenty-fifth Years of the reign of Her Majesty Queen Victoria, 1861. Queen's Printer. East Harding Street, London. 1861. Pages 454 to 467.  from Google Books.
James Edward Davis. The Criminal Law Consolidation Statutes of the 24 & 25 of Victoria, Chapters 94 to 100: Edited with Notes, Critical and Explanatory. Butterworths. 1861. Pages v to xviii (introduction) and pp. 7 to 19 (complete annotated text of the Act) (from Google Books).
Greaves, The Criminal Law Consolidation and Amendment Acts. Second Edition. V R Stevens, Sons, Haynes, H Sweet and W Maxwell. London. 1862. Pages 349 to 367 (complete annotated text of the Act).
Francis Towers Streeten and Edward Alfred Hadley. An Analytical Digest of the Cases Reported and Published from Trinity Term 1860 to Michaelmas Term 1865, and contained in the Law Journal Reports, and other contemporary Reports; with References to Statutes Passed within the Same Period. Edward Bret Ince. London. 1868. Page 579 et seq.

External links
List of amendments and repeals in the Republic of Ireland from the Irish Statute Book.

United Kingdom Acts of Parliament 1861